Bari Weiss (born March 25, 1984) is an American journalist, writer, and editor. She was an op-ed and book review editor at The Wall Street Journal (2013–2017) and an op-ed staff editor and writer on culture and politics at The New York Times (2017–2020). Since March 1, 2021, she has worked as a regular columnist for German daily newspaper Die Welt. Weiss founded the media company The Free Press (formerly Common Sense) and hosts the podcast Honestly.

Early life and education
Weiss was born in Pittsburgh, Pennsylvania, to Lou and Amy Weiss, former owners of Weisshouse, a Pittsburgh company founded in 1943 that sells flooring, furniture, and kitchens; they own flooring company Weisslines. She grew up in the Squirrel Hill neighborhood and graduated from Pittsburgh's Community Day School and Shady Side Academy. The eldest daughter among four sisters, she attended the Tree of Life Synagogue and had her bat mitzvah ceremony there. After high school, Weiss went to Israel on a Nativ gap year program, helping build a medical clinic for Bedouins in the Negev desert and studying at a feminist yeshiva and the Hebrew University of Jerusalem.

Weiss attended Columbia University in New York City, graduating in 2007. She founded the Columbia Coalition for Sudan in response to the War in Darfur. Weiss was the founding editor from 2005 to 2007 of The Current, a magazine at Columbia for politics, culture, and Jewish affairs. Following graduation, Weiss was a Wall Street Journal Bartley Fellow in 2007 and a Dorot Fellow from 2007 to 2008 in Jerusalem.

Columbians for Academic Freedom

As a student at Columbia, Weiss took an active role in the Columbia Unbecoming controversy. Following the release of the film Columbia Unbecoming in fall 2004, alleging classroom intimidation of pro-Israel students by pro-Palestinian professors, she co-founded Columbians for Academic Freedom (CAF) together with Aharon Horwitz, Daniella Kahane, and Ariel Beery. Weiss said she had felt intimidated by Professor Joseph Massad in his lectures, and she thought he spent too much time talking about Zionism and Israel for a course about the entire Middle East.

In response to the release of the film, Columbia put together a committee to examine the allegations. The committee criticized Massad, but emphasized a lack of civility on campus, including from pro-Israel students who heckled some of their professors. Weiss criticized the committee for its focus on individual grievances, maintaining that students were intimidated because of their views.

In her 2019 book, How to Fight Anti-Semitism, Weiss describes the contentious atmosphere during this period as giving her "a front row seat to leftist anti-Semitism" at the university. The activism initiated by Weiss was alleged by Glenn Greenwald to be "designed to ruin the careers of Arab professors by equating their criticisms of Israel with racism, anti-Semitism, and bullying, and its central demand was that those professors (some of whom lacked tenure) be disciplined for their transgressions." Weiss has called Greenwald's characterizations "baseless", saying that she "advocated for the rights of students to express their viewpoints in the classroom", adding, "I don't know when criticizing professors became out of bounds."

Career
In 2007, Weiss worked for Haaretz and The Forward. In Haaretz, she criticized the tenure promotion of Barnard College anthropologist Nadia Abu El-Haj over a book that Weiss alleged caricatured Israeli archaeologists. From 2011 to 2013, Weiss was senior news and politics editor at Tablet.

2013–2017: The Wall Street Journal
Weiss was an op-ed and book review editor at The Wall Street Journal from 2013 until April 2017. She left following the departure of Pulitzer Prize winner and deputy editor Bret Stephens, for whom she had worked, and joined him at The New York Times.

2017–2020: The New York Times
In 2017, as part of an effort by The New York Times to broaden the ideological range of its opinion staff after the inauguration of President Trump, opinion editor James Bennet hired Weiss as an op-ed staff editor and writer about culture and politics. Through her first year at the paper, she wrote opinion pieces advocating for the blending of cultural influences, something derided by what she termed the "strident left" as cultural appropriation. She criticized the organizers of the 2017 Women's March protesting the inauguration of President Trump for their "chilling ideas and associations," particularly singling out several individuals she believed to have made antisemitic or anti-Zionist statements in the past. Her article about the Chicago Dyke March, asserting that intersectionality is a "caste system, in which people are judged according to how much their particular caste has suffered throughout history," was condemned by playwright Eve Ensler, creator of the Vagina Monologues, for misunderstanding the work of intersectional politics. Other sources condemned the article as fundamentally misunderstanding the definition of intersectionality.

In January 2018, Babe.net published an anonymous woman's allegation that comedian and actor Aziz Ansari's behavior during a date rose to the level of sexual assault. Weiss published a piece titled "Aziz Ansari Is Guilty. Of Not Being a Mind Reader", one of many responses to this incident in the context of the #MeToo movement. Weiss was one of several writers, including Caitlin Flanagan of  The Atlantic, who argued that the woman who wrote the piece ignored her own agency, not considering her own ability to speak up and leave the situation. (Flanagan's essay was one of several that year for which she was a finalist for the 2019 Pulitzer Prize for Commentary).

In March 2018, Weiss published the column "We're All Fascists Now" in which she argued that members of the left-wing are increasingly intolerant of alternate views, presenting varied examples. Shortly after publication, the piece was corrected and an editorial note was placed on it because one of the examples used was a fake antifa Twitter account. This account had been identified as fake in multiple media outlets in 2017 as a right-wing masquerade aimed at discrediting the left-wing protest movement.

In May 2018, Weiss published "Meet the Renegades of the Intellectual Dark Web". This piece profiled a collection of thinkers who share an unorthodox approach to their fields and to the media landscape. Weiss collectively described them as the Intellectual Dark Web, borrowing the term from Eric Weinstein, managing director of Thiel Capital. Outlets have commented on and critiqued the label through 2020.

On June 7, 2020, the Times editorial page editor, James Bennet, resigned after more than 1,000 staffers signed a letter protesting his publication of an op-ed by U.S. Senator Tom Cotton saying that since "rioters have plunged many American cities into anarchy," soldiers should be sent as backup for the police to end the violence. Bennet later stated he had not read the op-ed beforehand. Weiss characterized the internal controversy as an ongoing "civil war" between what she called young "social justice warriors" and what she identified as older "free speech advocate" staffers. This characterization was disputed by numerous other journalists and opinion writers at the Times; Taylor Lorenz, a technology reporter who covers internet culture, described it as a "willful misrepresentation" that ignored the numerous older staffers who had spoken out, while Jamal Jordan, the Times''' digital storytelling editor, criticized her for not listening to her black colleagues and instead dismissing their concerns as a "woke civil war".

2020: Resignation from The New York Times
Weiss announced her departure from The New York Times on July 14, 2020, publishing a resignation letter on her website criticizing the Times for capitulating to criticism on Twitter and for not defending her against alleged bullying by her colleagues. Weiss accused her former employer of "unlawful discrimination, hostile work environment, and constructive discharge".

Her resignation from the Times drew considerable news coverage after accusing the Times of "caving to the whims of critics on Twitter." In her letter Weiss said, "Stories are chosen and told in a way to satisfy the narrowest of audiences, rather than to allow a curious public to read about the world and then draw their own conclusions." She also wrote, "Twitter is not on the masthead of The New York Times, but Twitter has become its ultimate editor."

Her letter was praised by U.S. Senators Ted Cruz, Marco Rubio, and Kelly Loeffler; Donald Trump Jr.; political commentator Ben Shapiro; former Democratic presidential candidates Andrew Yang and Marianne Williamson; and political commentator Bill Maher. Conversely, Weiss's resignation letter attracted substantial criticism from left-leaning media sources. Alex Shephard criticized the content of Weiss's letter in The New Republic, calling Weiss's resignation a form of "self-cancellation" and part of a pattern in Weiss's work of "taking thin, anecdotal evidence and framing it in grandiose, culture-war terms". Writing in The Guardian, Moira Donegan called Weiss a "professional rightwing attention seeker" and disputed her claim that social media's influence had led to a hostile media environment for conservatives.

The Financial Times has described Weiss as a "self-styled free speech martyr." In 2021, Weiss compared her own professional travails to Galileo Galilei, an Italian scientist who was threatened with being burnt at the stake if he did not renounce his scientific views.

On October 27, 2020, Weiss appeared on the American talk show The View to discuss cancel culture, which she called "wrong and deeply un-American"; she continued, "I believe that no one should be hung or have their reputation destroyed or lose their job because of a mistake or liking a bad tweet."

Beginning in 2020, Weiss occasionally wrote articles for the German newspaper Die Welt. Since March 1, 2021, she works as Contributing editor for Die Welt.

 2021–present: Substack and media 
In January 2021, Weiss launched a Substack newsletter entitled "Common Sense". The name was later changed to "The Free Press", which became a media company of the same name. In February, she interviewed Gina Carano about her firing from The Mandalorian. On November 8, 2021, Pano Kanelos, formerly the president of St. John's College, announced the creation of the University of Austin in Weiss's newsletter.

Political views
According to The Washington Post, Weiss "portrays herself as a liberal uncomfortable with the excesses of left-wing culture", and has sought to "position herself as a reasonable liberal concerned that far-left critiques stifled free speech." Vanity Fair described Weiss as "a provocateur". The Jewish Telegraphic Agency said that her writing "doesn't lend itself easily to labels." Weiss has been described as conservative by Haaretz, The Times of Israel, The Daily Dot, and Business Insider. In an interview with Joe Rogan, she described herself as a "left-leaning centrist".

Weiss has expressed support for Israel and Zionism in her columns. When writer Andrew Sullivan described her as an "unhinged Zionist", she responded saying she "happily plead[s] guilty as charged." In 2018, she said she believed the sexual assault allegations against Supreme Court justice nominee Brett Kavanaugh, but questioned whether they should disqualify him from serving on the Supreme Court because he was 17 when he allegedly committed the assault against Christine Blasey Ford. After backlash in the press, Weiss conceded that her sound bite was glib and simplistic, and said instead that Kavanaugh's "rage-filled behavior" before the Senate Judiciary Committee should have disqualified him.

Following the Tree of Life synagogue massacre in Squirrel Hill, Pittsburgh, Weiss was a guest on Real Time with Bill Maher in early November 2018. She said of American Jews who support President Donald Trump: "I hope this week that American Jews have woken up to the price of that bargain: They have traded policies that they like for the values that have sustained the Jewish people—and frankly, this country—forever: Welcoming the stranger; dignity for all human beings; equality under the law; respect for dissent; love of truth." In 2019, The Jerusalem Post named Weiss the seventh most influential Jew in the world.

In January 2022, Weiss received backlash for her comments on the late night talk show Real Time with Bill Maher criticizing COVID-19 pandemic restrictions, citing that the COVID-19 pandemic response had resulted in mental health issues and that as a result she was "done with COVID". Commenting about the incident, MSNBC host Mehdi Hasan said that "Young kids are handling COVID 'less childishly' than Bari Weiss, other 'done with COVID' elites." Dr. Jonathan Reiner in an interview with CNN responded to her comments by advising Weiss to "grow up."

 Personal life 
Weiss prefers not to label her sexual orientation but has stated that although she had been married to a man, she is mostly attracted to women. While attending Columbia University, she had an on-and-off relationship with comedian Kate McKinnon. She also dated Ariel Beery, with whom she had co-founded Columbians for Academic Freedom. From 2013 to 2016, Weiss was married to environmental engineer Jason Kass. Since 2018, Weiss has been in a relationship with Nellie Bowles,Gilbert, Andrew (March 2, 2021)."S.F.-raised journalist's path to Judaism started on a date with Bari Weiss." J. The Jewish News of Northern California. Retrieved November 11, 2021. a former tech reporter for The New York Times. The couple have since married, and have a daughter, born in 2022.

Works
 How to Fight Anti-Semitism, published in September 2019
 The New Seven Dirty Words, announced in 2019

 Awards 

 2018: Reason Foundation’s Bastiat Prize, which honors writing that "best demonstrates the importance of freedom with originality, wit and eloquence."
 2019: National Jewish Book Award in Contemporary Jewish Life and Practice for How to Fight Anti-Semitism  2021: LA Press Club's Daniel Pearl Award for Courage and Integrity in Journalism, "for her persistent willingness to resist groupthink, her commitment to telling the truth, even when it’s politically inconvenient, and her courage in standing up for her people against the rising tide of antisemitism and Zionophobia” (Judea Pearl in the name of the Daniel Pearl Foundation).

References

External links

 Articles by Bari Weiss at Tablet Articles by Bari Weiss at The New York Times''
 Articles by Bari Weiss at Substack

1984 births
Living people
21st-century American non-fiction writers
21st-century American women writers
American political commentators
American political writers
American women non-fiction writers
American Zionists
Die Welt people
Jewish American journalists
Columbia College (New York) alumni
Jewish women writers
LGBT Jews
LGBT women
American LGBT writers
The New York Times people
Shady Side Academy alumni
The Wall Street Journal people
Writers from Pittsburgh
Writers on antisemitism
21st-century American Jews
21st-century American LGBT people
Centrism in the United States